Joseph C. Ferguson School is a historic school building located in the Cecil B. Moore neighborhood of Philadelphia, Pennsylvania.  It was designed by Irwin T. Catharine and built in 1921–1922. It is a three-story, nine bay, U-shaped brick building on a raised basement, in the Colonial Revival-style. It features large stone arches, a double stone cornice, and brick parapet. The school is named after Joseph C. Ferguson a judge that was a part of Philadelphia orphan court.

It was added to the National Register of Historic Places in 1988.

The building is currently the home The U School, an innovative high school in the School District of Philadelphia. The U School and Building 21, two schools with a non-selective lottery-based admissions process, opened at the Ferguson building during the 2014–2015 school year. Building 21 relocated after three academic years, and The U School remains.

References

External links
The U School homepage
Building 21 homepage

School buildings on the National Register of Historic Places in Philadelphia
Colonial Revival architecture in Pennsylvania
School buildings completed in 1922
Templetown, Philadelphia
1922 establishments in Pennsylvania